Erlinsbach is the name of two municipalities in Switzerland:

 Erlinsbach, Aargau
 Erlinsbach, Solothurn